Désiré Antoine Acket (4 May 1905 – 29 July 1987) was a Belgian painter. He competed in the 1932 Summer Olympics.

References

1905 births
1987 deaths
Belgian painters
Artists from Antwerp
Olympic competitors in art competitions